Järva Teataja is newspaper published in Paide, Järva County by Postimees Grupp.

Newspaper's editor-in-chief is Tiit Reinberg.

Earlier names
Earlier names as follows:
1926–1940 Järva Teataja
1941 Töötav Järvalane
1941–1944 Järva Teataja
1944–1945 Uus Järvalane
1945–1950 Järvalane
1951–1956 Stalinlik tee
1956–1989 Võitlev Sõna
from 1989 Järva Teataja.

References

External links

Newspapers published in Estonia
Paide